Halsall v Brizell [1957] Ch 169 is an English land law case, concerning the enforceability of a positive covenant, that is required positive obligations, in this case the obligation to pay money for upkeep and repair.

Facts
Homebuyers on a Liverpool estate owned their property enjoying the right (having an easement) to use estate roads, drains, the promenade, and sea walls subject to the obligation to contribute to repair and upkeep. Brizell, a successor of an original purchaser (buyer from the developer), wished to continue to benefit from all of these but claimed he should not need to pay, as payment was a positive covenant.

Law
It was already old law that positive covenants routinely bind successors in leasehold land. Until this case, conflicting decisions pointed to a narrow category of application of positive covenants (chiefly limited to for example the obligation to erect and maintain railings or fences) could bind successors (beyond the first covenantor, that is purchaser or donee) owning freehold land. This decision clarified that positive covenants, such as the responsibility to maintain or repair infrastructure, attached to a right to enjoy and use that infrastructure, can routinely attach to freeholders who choose to use that infrastructure.

Judgment
Mr Justice Upjohn held that Brizell could not claim the benefit of the facilities without having to pay for them. He could not exercise the rights without paying his costs of ensuring that they could be exercised.

Significance
The case was approved by Rhone v Stephens, but also distinguished. Lord Templeman said the following.

Applied in
Tito v Waddell (No 2) [1977] Ch 106 (EWHC before the Vice-Chancellor, the Head of the Chancery Division)
ER Ives Investment Ltd v High [1967] 2 QB 379 (EWCA)

Not applied in
Signature of St Albans (Property) Guernsey Ltd v Wragg [2017] EWHC 2352 (Ch) (distinguishing case law followed)

See also

English land law
Easements in English law
Rentcharges

References

1957 in British law
1957 in case law
Covenant (law)
English land case law
High Court of Justice cases